Narayandas Malkani (1890–1974) was a noted social worker and freedom fighter from Rajasthan state in India. He was an academic by profession. He was the eldest brother of K R Malkani. They hailed from Hyderabad, Sindh. He was conferred the Padma Bhushan award in 1973 by the Government of India. He was a member of Rajya Sabha for two terms.

Malkani left teaching, joined Mahatma Gandhi and became his close confidant. He later took up constructive work in Sindh. He helped influence Allah Bux in favor of Congress and introduced Congress to Pir Pagaro of the Hurs.

References

External links

People from Sindh
Rajasthani people
Recipients of the Padma Bhushan in social work
Sindhi people
Indian independence activists from Rajasthan
Nominated members of the Rajya Sabha
Social workers
Rajasthani politicians
1890 births
1974 deaths
Social workers from Rajasthan